Michael Lipton  (born 13 February 1937) is a British economist specialising in rural poverty in developing countries, including issues relating to land reform and urban bias. He has spent much of his career at the University of Sussex, but also contributed to the work of international institutions, such as the World Bank's 2000/2001 World Development Report on poverty. He was reader, then professorial fellow, at the university's Institute of Development Studies 1967–94, and since 1994 he has been research professor at the University of Sussex's Poverty Research Unit, which he founded.

Lipton was elected to the British Academy in 2006 and shared the 2012 Leontief Prize. He was appointed CMG in 2003.

Selected works
 Why Poor People Stay Poor: Urban Bias and World Development (1977, 1988)
 New Seeds and Poor People (with Richard Longhurst, 1989)
 Does Aid Work in India? (with John Toye, 1991)
 Successes in Anti-poverty (1998, 2001)
 Land Reform in Developing Countries: Property rights and property wrongs (2009), Routledge, 
 Crecimiento equilibrado y crecimiento desequilibrado en los países subdesarrollados. Estudios económicos, 2(3), 55–84. https://doi.org/10.52292/j.estudecon.1963.983

References
LIPTON, Prof. Michael, Who's Who 2014, A & C Black, 2014; online edn, Oxford University Press, 2014

External links
 Michael Lipton homepage
 Lipton bio, Sussex

1937 births
Living people
People educated at Haberdashers' Boys' School
Fellows of All Souls College, Oxford
British development economists
Academics of the University of Sussex
Fellows of the British Academy
Companions of the Order of St Michael and St George